Artyom Simonyan (born December 27, 1975, in Yerevan, Armenia) is an Armenian amateur boxer.

Amateur career
Simonyan won a silver medal at the 1998 European Amateur Boxing Championships in the featherweight division and a bronze medal at the 1998 Boxing World Cup in the featherweight division.

Professional career
Simonyan amassed a record of 13-0-1 (7 KO) from 2000 to 2003 and won the USBA Super Bantamweight title. He then won an IBF Super Bantamweight Title Eliminator and challenged Israel Vázquez for the IBF Super Bantamweight Championship. Simonyan lost via fifth round technical knockout. He later retired with a record of 15-3-2 (7 KO).

References

External links

1975 births
Living people
Sportspeople from Yerevan
Featherweight boxers
Armenian male boxers